Irina Dorofeeva is a singer from Belarus.

Eurovision Song Contest 2011
On January 15, 2011, National State Television and Radio Company of the Republic of Belarus announced that Dorofeeva will represent Belarus in the Eurovision Song Contest 2011 but she was replaced by Anastasia Vinnikova.

References

 http://www.blic.rs/Zabava/Vesti/229443/Joksimovic-Izazov-je-komponovati-pesmu-za-Belorusiju-na-Evroviziji
 http://www.oikotimes.com/v2/index.php?file=articles&id=9593

21st-century Belarusian women singers
Living people
Year of birth missing (living people)